The Cross-City Line is a commuter rail line in the West Midlands region of England. Services are operated by West Midlands Trains.

Cross-City Line services began in 1978, as a project of the West Midlands Passenger Transport Executive (WMPTE) to improve local rail services. It made use of pre-existing railways lines, which previously did not have any through services. The route was electrified in 1993.

History

Constituent railways
What is now the Cross-City Line was not built as a single route; it is a combination of lines opened by different companies at different times, between 1837 and 1885.

On the northern half of the route (Birmingham–Lichfield):

This was extended towards the centre of Birmingham, at Curzon Street, the following year, and into Birmingham New Street in 1854. 

On the southern half of the route (Birmingham–Redditch):

The single-track branch line from Barnt Green to  followed in 1859, as part of the Midland Railway's Gloucester Loop Line, which was closed south of Redditch in 1964.

These lines from Birmingham to Barnt Green and Redditch were operated by the Midland Railway and the line to Lichfield was operated by the London and North Western Railway, so there were no through services. This continued despite the Grouping of the LNW and Midland Railways to form the London Midland and Scottish Railway in 1921, and subsequent nationalisation to form British Railways.

Prior to the creation of the Cross-City Line, the northern half of the route from New Street to Sutton Coldfield and Lichfield had a well used regular suburban service, which had been switched from steam to diesel multiple unit (DMU) operation in 1956, leading to a large increase in usage. However, the southern half of the route from New Street to Redditch was a different matter: In 1964, the closure of all the stations between New Street and Redditch (along with the branch to Redditch) was proposed by the Beeching Axe. They were reprieved from closure in 1967, however the service was cut back to a handful of trains at peak times for commuters.

1978: consolidated route
In the early-1970s the West Midlands Passenger Transport Executive (WMPTE) gained responsibility for managing and planning the local railway network in the West Midlands, and they set about looking for ways it could be improved: The WMPTE Passenger Transport Plan of 1972 recognised the need for a cross-city rail service, and especially an improved service to the south of Birmingham with new stations to serve the growth areas in the south of the city.

The Cross City Line project was sanctioned by the WMPTE in May 1975 and launched on 8 May 1978. Costing £7.4 million, it involved joining the services into Birmingham from north and south into a single through service, along with the re-opening of Five Ways station (the original had closed in 1944 as a wartime economy measure) and new stations to serve the University of Birmingham and Longbridge (the former station at Longbridge was on the branch line to Halesowen and Old Hill). Most of the other stations on the southern half of the route were rebuilt at the same time, and improvements were made to signalling and junctions. Of the new stations, the only one to be officially opened was University, which the then Secretary of State for Transport Bill Rodgers MP formally opened on 8 May 1978. There is a plaque on platform 2 marking this occasion.

Services initially ran on a 15-minute frequency between Longbridge and Four Oaks via Birmingham New Street, with an hourly extension to Lichfield City, using refurbished Class 116 Diesel Multiple Units. The new service was an instant success, and by the end of the first year was carrying 30,000 passengers daily.

1980s developments
Services were extended to Redditch in 1980, initially on an hourly frequency, increased to half-hourly in 1989. The service to Lichfield City was increased to half hourly in 1986, and on 28 November 1988, some services were extended to terminate at the re-opened high level platforms of Lichfield Trent Valley.

1990s: Electrification
By the late-1980s, the elderly diesels operating the service were becoming increasingly unreliable, and the WMPTE (now re-branded as Centro) pressed for electrification. The decision to electrify the line was made on 7 February 1990 by the then Transport Minister Cecil Parkinson during the campaign for a by-election in the Mid Staffordshire constituency.

Work started on electrifying the route with the 25 kV AC overhead line system in May 1990, and it was completed on 6 June 1993. Redditch, Alvechurch, and Blake Street stations were rebuilt at this time, and several other stations including Barnt Green were extensively modified to accommodate the new longer electric trains. The signalling was also modernised at the same time as the electrification, as part of a parallel scheme. A new fleet of Class 323 Electric Multiple Units were introduced to work the electrified line, and replace the elderly diesels. Full service with the Class 323s did not begin until 1994, due to initial reliability problems with the new units. Some elderly ,  and  EMUs were drafted in to operate services in the interim, along with some of the original diesel units.

The cost of the electrification scheme was estimated at £64.5 million, of which around 70% was funded by Centro, and the remainder by the Regional Railways sector of British Rail.

21st century developments

At Selly Oak, a new bridge was constructed in 2011 to carry the canal over a new section of the A38.

The single track between Barnt Green and Redditch restricted the number of trains that could run to Redditch to two per hour. The line between Barnt Green and Redditch was closed for eight weeks for the works to be carried out, and was reopened on 1 September 2014. The improved service began in December 2014.

Electrification was also extended from Barnt Green to Bromsgrove station, which was rebuilt in 2016 and was added as a second southern terminus once electrification was completed in August 2018. These changes allow three trains per hour to run to both Redditch and Bromsgrove.

Three of the ten new Class 350 trains that London Midland introduced in 2014 have displaced Class 323s on other routes in the West Midlands to enable an increase in service frequency and capacity between Longbridge and Redditch, and the extension of all remaining Longbridge trains to Bromsgrove once electrification is complete. Class 350s are not currently authorised to be used on the Cross City Line.

Current services

The service consists of:
2tph from Lichfield Trent Valley to Bromsgrove
2tph from Four Oaks to Redditch

Between Birmingham New Street and Barnt Green, the Cross-City Line is contiguous with the Cross Country Route.

Tracks are also shared with the Chase Line between Birmingham New Street and Aston.

Future
There are long-standing proposals for the re-introduction of local trains on the Camp Hill Line (effectively a loop between Birmingham New Street and Kings Norton).

As part of the new West Midlands Trains franchise, the Class 323 units will be replaced by Class 730 Aventras.

In October 2018, as part of a 30-year strategy of Transport in the West Midlands several proposals were put forward. Beyond 2034, it was proposed that new semi-fast service could serve more larger stations.

There is also a single tracked mothballed line to the former Angelsea Sidings which was in use until 2001. The line remains in situ but rusty beyond repair. There is a possibility that the line which connected to Walsall from Lichfield via Brownhills and Pelsall could reopen as Mayor of the West Midlands Andy Street promised to look and make the reopening of the line feasible. West Midlands Combined Authority also released a plan for the line as part of a 10-year transport plan called the 2026 Delivery for Transport.

Passenger volume

Route description

The railway stations and cities, towns and villages served by the line are listed below.
Lichfield Trent Valley – on the outskirts of Lichfield, with connections to London Northwestern services along the Trent Valley line between London Euston and Crewe
Lichfield City railway station – in central Lichfield
Shenstone railway station in Shenstone, Staffordshire
Blake Street railway station in Hill Hook, Sutton Coldfield
Butlers Lane railway station in northern Four Oaks
Four Oaks railway station in Four Oaks, Sutton Coldfield
Sutton Coldfield railway station in Sutton Coldfield
Wylde Green railway station serving Wylde Green and Boldmere
Chester Road railway station serving Pype Hayes and northern Erdington
Erdington railway station in Erdington
Gravelly Hill railway station in Gravelly Hill
Aston railway station in Aston – the Walsall Line diverges here
Duddeston railway station in Duddeston
Birmingham New Street railway station in Birmingham City Centre
Five Ways railway station  in Five Ways, Birmingham
University railway station serving the University of Birmingham and Queen Elizabeth Hospital
Selly Oak railway station in Selly Oak
Bournville railway station in Bournville
Kings Norton railway station in Kings Norton and Cotteridge
Northfield railway station in Northfield, Birmingham
Longbridge railway station in Longbridge
Barnt Green railway station  in Barnt Green – branches off the main line to Cheltenham here.
Alvechurch railway station  in Alvechurch
Redditch railway station in Redditch
Bromsgrove railway station in Bromsgrove
A large stretch of the northern part of the line closely follows the A5127 road.

Media

In 1990, Railscene produced a driver's eye view of the then-diesel line, featuring the elderly rolling stock still in operation. Many features of the line have since been changed, for example, the rebuilding of Alvechurch and Redditch stations, the abolition of Lichfield City's goods sidings and closure of the Brownhills Line and the removal of the fourth platform of Lichfield Trent Valley.
There was a highly publicised opening ceremony to celebrate the electrification and service enhancement at Redditch in 1993.
In 1995, Video 125 released a video of a driver's eye view of the recently electrified line, narrated by Kay Alexander. On the video near Lichfield an elderly Class 304 unit is used on the opposite direction service – this was due to not all 323 units being in traffic in time for the new services starting.
A full replica of the Cross-City line was released for the Train Simulator franchise in March 2021 and on Train Sim World 3 in November 2022 by Dovetail Games, both featuring the Class 323.
There is a highly detailed reproduction of the part between Redditch and Birmingham New Street for the free train simulators BVE and OpenBVE.

See also

Transport in Birmingham
Camp Hill Line

References

Bibliography
 

Railway lines in the West Midlands (region)
Rail transport in Birmingham, West Midlands
Rail transport in Worcestershire
Railway lines opened in 1978